The Jachie-Pramso Secondary School is a co-ed second cycle school in Jachie-Pramso in the Bosomtwe District of the Ashanti Region of Ghana.

History 
The school was established in 1970.

Notable alumni
Prof. Ken Attafuah - Ghanaian criminologist and Head of National Identification Authority
Sarfo Ansah - Ghanaian sprinter, Athlete at Tokyo 2020 Olympics

References

Schools in Ghana
Ashanti Region
High schools and secondary schools in Ghana